London to Brighton refers to a variety of races, tours, charity bicycle rides and rallies that take place between London and Brighton in the United Kingdom.

The route often follows the A23 (and, often, nearby minor roads). The route is full of contrasts, (depending on the starting point and exact route) passing through the London suburbs of Westminster, Brixton, Sutton, Croydon and Purley, past Gatwick Airport, Crawley and then into the countryside of The Weald, crossing the North and South Downs. Ditchling Beacon on the South Downs (near but not part of the A23) is a steep climb followed by a gentle descent for five miles into Brighton, where the route finishes on the promenade by the Kings Road arches. The current London to Brighton Veteran Car Run does not use the route past the Ditchling Beacon but follows the A273 road up Clayton Hill and rejoins the A23 at Pyecombe.

London to Brighton Veteran Car Run

In 2007 531 cars participated and over ninety percent of them finished the course; in 2008 there were 550, with 126 international entries from as far away as Australia, Canada, USA, Argentina and South Africa.

London to Brighton Bike Ride

Several fundraising bike rides take place between London and Brighton each year. The most famous is the British Heart Foundation event which has taken place each summer since 1976, and in 2014 involved an estimated 30,000 riders. The event starts on Clapham Common and the 54 mile route finishes on Madeira Drive in Brighton. Despite most roads being closed to cars, the number of bikes is such that traffic jams occur, especially at hills. Several sections are somewhat steeper, and whilst the fittest will try to cycle up, the vast majority will walk.

To date, over 650,000 riders have taken part and have raised over £40 million for the British Heart Foundation. In recent years, the BHF have introduced a night ride and an off-road ride. These are on separate dates, and some competitors will ride all three routes in the same year.

Challenge Cancer Bike Ride
Challenge Cancer is a London to Brighton bike ride to raise funds for Macmillan Cancer Support, Cancer Research UK and Breast Cancer Now and Prostate Cancer UK, with each rider choosing which charity to support. Following a 67-mile route through Central London, over Tower Bridge, and south through Oval, Clapham, Balham, Mitcham, Wallington, Coulsdon, Caterham-on-the-hill, Outwood, Smallfield, Copthorne, Turners Hill, Burgess Hill, Ditchling Beacon and Brighton seafront before finishing at Brighton Racecourse.

All roads were open to other traffic, and a vehicle fire on the Mile End Road delayed a number of riders.

All participants were timed from start to finish line. The published results (which included time spent a rest stops) indicated that nearly 1000 riders took part

Challenge Cancer 2015 was a fund-raising bike ride in the United Kingdom organised by Macmillan Cancer Support, Breakthrough Breast Cancer, Cancer Research UK and Prostate Cancer UK. It expands on the inaugural event of the previous year by adding a second route between Manchester and Leeds. Both routes are described as 60 miles long. A 120-mile "there and back" option is also available on both routes.

Running events
An ultramarathon running race used to take this route each October, starting on Westminster Bridge in the centre of London, and finishing at The Level in Brighton.  This is a distance of 54 miles, 198 yards (87.085 km). The race was organised by the Road Runners Club from 1951 to 2005. However, the course had been raced over at least since the early 19th century, and regularly since 1899. In its later years the race was low-key with just over one hundred runners taking part. The fastest would finish in well under 6 hours, whilst there was a time limit of 10 hours after which the course was not marshalled. The race was discontinued after 2005 because of increasing road traffic and difficulties in finding sufficient marshals.

In 2010 the ultra-running organisation Extreme Running staged an off-road London to Brighton Trail Race from Blackheath in London to Brighton sea front (56 miles). The winning time was 8 hours 32 minutes. The race was next planned to be held in 2011.

Since 2011, the company UltraChallenge has organised annually a mixed road/trail 100K race from Richmond in West London to Brighton's racecourse. The course can be run or walked.

From Piccadilly to Brighton there is a marathon route.

Motoring events

The London to Brighton Mini Run takes place on the 3rd Sunday in May. It celebrated its 25th anniversary in 2010. In 2009 the event broke the world record for the longest convoy of Minis with a Guinness-verified total of 1450 cars. The London to Brighton Mini Run features a large number of Minis both classic and modern. It is organised by the London & Surrey Mini Owners Club.

In 2005 this tradition was copied in the United States. The SotaMINIs car club organized the New London to New Brighton Run in the state of Minnesota (Mini-sota).  Minnesota is the only state in the US that has both a New London and a New Brighton. The distance between the two is exactly twice the distance from London to Brighton. The first year it was attended by 20 MINIs/Minis. It has since doubled in size.  The club, SotaMINIs (new MINIs) has since merged with the Classic Mini club called MMPE&PSHE (the Mini-sota Minis Pizza Eating & Psychiatric Self-Help Association). The new club is called Minnesota United Minis Minnesota United Minis (M.U.M.) and the tradition of the New London to New Brighton run is still going strong in 2016.

The London to Brighton Land Rover Run is an annual gathering of Land Rover enthusiasts organised by the South London and Surrey Land Rover Club. The event started at Crystal Palace Park until an extension of the London Emissions Zone forced it to move. Since 2012 it has been held at Hook Road Arena in Epsom and the Land Rovers drive down to Madeira Drive in Brighton. The event takes place on or around the first Sunday in October.

Other events

Other London to Brighton events include those for MGs, air-cooled Volkswagens, 2CVs, vintage motorcycles, Smart Cars, vintage commercial vehicles, and electric vehicles. Most events, especially motoring events, finish at Madeira Drive on the seafront.

See also
 London to Brighton in Four Minutes, speeded-up film of train journey 
 Transport in Brighton
 Landmarks and notable buildings of Brighton and Hove

References

External links
London to Brighton Veteran Car Run official site
London to Brighton Mini Run organised by London & Surrey Mini Owners Club
The 100-miler – Part 5 (1902-1926) London to Brighton and Back
Extreme Running London to Brighton Trail Race
London to Brighton Land Rover run
British Heart Foundation London to Brighton Bike Rides
Cycle Rides Ltd: Managers of the London to Brighton Bike Ride
Video of Centenary Year Run 2003
Capital to Coast Cycle Challenge

Brighton and Hove
Brighton
Ultramarathons in the United Kingdom
Sport in East Sussex